The 1st women's Biathlon World Championships were held in 1984 in Chamonix, France.

Women's results

10 km individual

5 km sprint

3 × 5 km relay

Medal table

References

1984
Biathlon World Championships
International sports competitions hosted by France
1984 in French sport
February 1984 sports events in Europe
March 1984 sports events in Europe
Biathlon competitions in France
Sport in Chamonix